Martin Airport may refer to:

 Martin Airport (Slovakia) in Martin, Slovakia (ICAO: LZMA)
 Martin Municipal Airport in Martin, South Dakota, United States (FAA: 9V6)
 Martin State Airport in Baltimore, Maryland, United States (FAA/IATA: MTN)
 Martin County Airport in Williamston, North Carolina, United States (FAA: MCZ)
 Ava Bill Martin Memorial Airport in Ava, Missouri, United States (FAA: AOV)
 Martin Field Airport (Alaska) in Lazy Mountain, Alaska, United States (FAA: AK92)

See also 
 Martin Field (disambiguation)